Bavarian C Is were steam locomotives with the Royal Bavarian State Railways (Königlich Bayerische Staatsbahn).

They were the first six-coupled engines in Bavaria and were developed specially for the route between Neuenmarkt, Wirsberg and Marktschorgast. This route had inclines up to 1:40. The loco had an inside frame, a boiler barrel without a steam dome, an inside Stephenson valve gear, single-sided, suspended Taschenkulissen and a rectangular ballast tank on the boiler barrel to increase the adhesion effect. A total of five were built by Maffei. They were named: SCHARRER, BEHAIM, LEIBNIZ, SAALE and SCHNEEBERG. There is a finely detailed 1:10 scale model of BEHAIM in the Nuremberg Transport Museum.

They were equipped with Bavarian tenders of the class 2 T 4.2 type.

Sources

See also
 List of Bavarian locomotives and railbuses

0-6-0 locomotives
C I
Standard gauge locomotives of Germany
Maffei locomotives
Railway locomotives introduced in 1847
C n2 locomotives
Freight locomotives